Edward Lee is a Brooklyn-born celebrity chef, author and restauranteur. He has made numerous television appearances on shows including The Mind of a Chef and Top Chef as well as a judge on Gordon Ramsay's Culinary Genius.  He is a nine-time James Beard Award nominee, owns multiple restaurants throughout the United States and the Caribbean, and is the author of two award winning books Buttermilk Graffiti and Smoke and Pickles.

Early life and career
Lee was born on July 2, 1972 and raised in Brooklyn to Korean parents. Lee began cooking at the age of 11 and credits his grandmother with first sparking his interest in food. Before college he was in a traveling circus. After graduating magna cum laude with a degree in literature from NYU, Lee began cooking professionally at the age of 22. He traveled to France and toured the US to learn more about different ingredients, cuisines and cooking methods. It was on a trip to the Kentucky Derby in 2001 that he fell in love with Louisville and Southern cooking. He moved to the city in 2002 and began working at 610 Magnolia with former chef/owner Eddie Garber. Lee now owns 610 Magnolia along with four other restaurants; Milkwood (closed 2020) and Whiskey Dry in Louisville, and two locations of Succotash, in Washington, D.C. and National Harbor. In 2007, Lee opened a venue for special events called The Wine Studio@610 Magnolia.

In 2011, he was one of the 'cheftestants' on season 9 of Top Chef. He won two elimination challenges, and finished fifth in the competition. He was also the host chef featured in the third season of The Mind of a Chef.

In 2014, Lee partnered with YouthBuild and IDEAS 40203 to create a culinary training program based in the Smoketown neighborhood of Louisville. The program trains youth who may not be able to afford expensive culinary schools with skills in all aspects of the restaurant industry. In 2015, Lee's young chef trainees launched a pop-up diner called Smoke & Soul.

Lee has been nominated four times by the James Beard Foundation for Best Chef: Southeast in 2011, 2012, 2013 and 2014. In 2013, he published a cookbook, Smoke and Pickles. The book received positive reviews from food journalists and other chefs including David Chang and Anthony Bourdain.

In 2017, Lee was the chef judge for the American adaptation of Culinary Genius.

In 2017, Lee founded The LEE Initiative. The LEE (Let’s Empower Employment) Initiative identifies issues surrounding diversity in the restaurant industry and creates solutions to help the restaurant community grow. The initiative includes two programs: Smoke and Soul and Women Chefs in Kentucky.

Cuisine
Edward Lee's approach to cooking frequently blends the flavors of his Korean heritage and culinary traditions and ingredients of the southern United States including sorghum, ham and bourbon. In The Mind of a Chef, Lee said he believes that food that grows in the same latitude often blends well together, even if the locations are thousands of miles apart.

Personal life
Lee is married to Kentucky native Dianne Durcholz (Lee). The couple welcomed a baby girl, Arden, in 2013.

References

Living people
American television chefs
American male chefs
Asian American chefs
Date of birth missing (living people)
Top Chef contestants
People from Brooklyn
American people of Korean descent
American restaurateurs
Businesspeople from Louisville, Kentucky
Year of birth missing (living people)
Chefs from Kentucky